The Presbyterian Church of Aotearoa New Zealand (PCANZ) is a major Christian denomination in New Zealand. A part of the Reformed tradition, it is the largest Presbyterian denomination in New Zealand,  and known for its relatively progressive stance on doctrine and social issues in comparison with smaller Presbyterian churches in the country. Presbyterianism was introduced to New Zealand by early 19th century settlers, particularly from Scotland and Ireland. It was historically most prevalent in the Otago region. The PCANZ was formed in 1901 with the amalgamation of southern and northern Presbyterian churches. It claims around 29,000 members.

History

The Presbyterian Church of New Zealand formed in October 1901 with the amalgamation of churches in the Synod of Otago and Southland (which had a largely Free Church heritage) with those north of the Waitaki River.

Unlike other major Christian churches, the Presbyterians did not send missionaries to New Zealand. Presbyterians had by and large come to New Zealand as settlers from Scotland, Ireland and Australia. Dunedin (founded in 1848) and Waipu (founded in 1853) were specifically Presbyterian settlements, but significant numbers of Presbyterians settled in other parts of the country, including Christchurch, Port Nicholson (Wellington), and Auckland. Ministers came with the first European settlers to Wellington, Otago and Waipu, but generally nascent congregations called ministers from Scotland. Missions to the Māori people focused on the Tuhoe people and led to the establishment of the Māori Synod, now known as Te Aka Puaho.

In 1862 the Presbytery of Auckland had had support from the Presbyterian Church of Ireland and also applied for support from the United Presbyterian Church of Scotland.

In 1906, 23 percent of New Zealanders (203,600) had identified as Presbyterians.

Ethnic diversity grew after World War II with the arrival of Dutch and other European immigrants, and more recently with Pacific Island and Asian migrants. In 1969 the majority of Congregational churches joined the Presbyterian Church of New Zealand. The word "Aotearoa" became part of the title of the denomination in 1990, affirming the treaty partnership between the indigenous Māori and the subsequent settlers.  PCANZ has 419 congregations.

Structure and activities

The Presbyterian Church is governed by a series of courts (councils) at local, regional and national levels. The leader of the church is called a moderator, and is elected by the national court.

In 2006 the denomination claimed 29,000 members in 430 congregations, and 400 ministers. According to the 2013 census a significantly higher 8.5 percent of the New Zealand population, or 330,516 adherents, claimed some form of affiliation with the Presbyterian Church.

International connections
 Christian Conference of Asia (CCA)
 Council for World Mission (CWM)
 World Communion of Reformed Churches (WCRC)
 World Council of Churches (WCC)

Social involvement
The Presbyterian Social Services Association (PSSA) – subsequently known as "Support" – began operating in the early 20th century.

Issues and controversies

Abuse allegations
In October 2022, Presbyterian Support Otago's chief executive Jo O'Neill acknowledged during the Royal Commission of Inquiry into Abuse in Care that at least six historical cases of abuse had occurred at its Glendining Presbyterian Children's Homes in Andersons Bay in Dunedin. O'Neill also testified that records about children housed under PSO's care had been deliberately destroyed by an alleged paedophile ring between 2017 and 2018. O'Neill also apologised to abuse survivors. In response to O'Neill's testimony, the Presbyterian Church of Aotearoa New Zealand launched an inquiry into an alleged pedophile ring operating within Dunedin's Presbyterian community. On 5 November, the Presbyterian Church confirmed that it had appointed a King's Counsel to investigate the paedophile ring allegations.

Breakaway groups
Several groups have broken away from the Presbyterian Church of Aotearoa New Zealand because of its liberal theology.

In the late 1940s migrants from the Netherlands settling in New Zealand expected to find their spiritual homes in existing churches of Reformed persuasion, particularly the Presbyterian Church of New Zealand. Instead they found it "less Reformed in doctrine and practice than they had hoped." They felt that the Declaratory Act of 1901 (which said that "diversity of opinion is recognised in this Church on such points in the Confession as do not enter into the substance of the Reformed Faith therein set forth") had "opened the doors of the Presbyterian Church to various 'winds of doctrine'." As a result, the Reformed Churches of New Zealand were officially established in 1953.

One group under George Mackenzie left in the 1960s and formed the Orthodox Presbyterian Church of New Zealand.

The other breakaway church is Grace Presbyterian Church of New Zealand, which was formed of both a group of pre-existing independent churches, and a number of churches that left the PCANZ after the homosexual controversy of 2003. These united into a new Presbyterian denomination for New Zealand.

Same-sex marriage
In 2003, the Church decided to allow ministers in sexual relationships other than marriage. This was overturned in 2004, and in a meeting of the General Assembly of the Church on 29 September 2006, this was confirmed by 230 votes to 124 (a 65% majority). This prevents people in de facto or gay relationships from becoming ministers in the church. It does not apply to people ordained before 2004. However, some liberal clergy have opposed this policy. In particular, St Andrew's Church on the Terrace in Wellington has announced that it supports same-sex marriage. St Andrew's church has been blessing same-sex civil unions since 2005. In 2014, when same-sex marriage became legal, St Andrew's Church also began performing same-sex marriage ceremonies. Other congregations have also chosen to support same-gender marriage.

See also
 Christianity in New Zealand

References

Further reading

External links
 Presbyterian Church of Aotearoa New Zealand – website
 Presbyterian Youth Ministry – website
 Reformed Churches of new Zealand

 
Presbyterian denominations in Oceania
Members of the World Council of Churches
Members of the World Communion of Reformed Churches
Christian organizations established in 1901
Presbyterian organizations established in the 20th century